Angharad Mair (born March 1960) is a Welsh television presenter; she is the lead presenter on the nightly S4C Welsh language magazine programme, Heno and the BBC Wales news programme, Wales Today.

Background
She was born in Carmarthen, South Wales, where she lived with her older sister and three younger brothers. Her first jobs were working in Tesco and The Ivy Bush Royal Hotel in Carmarthen.

Media career
After training and working for BBC Wales, where she worked on the Welsh language children's programme Bilidowcar, Mair joined Llanelli-based independent television production company Tinopolis in 1991. When Tinopolis produced both programmes from Cardiff, for a time she presented both the English language BBC Wales news Wales Today from 18:30 to 19:00, as well as the Welsh S4C Wedi 7 from 19:00 to 19:30. In 2008 Mair still presented Wedi7, and was Executive Director for Tinopolis, where by 2006 she held 2.482% of the shares.

Mair wrote a column in the Wales on Sunday newspaper. In December 2006 her comment on the break-up of the relationship of her friend, ITV1 weather presenter Sian Lloyd, against Lloyd's former partner Lembit Öpik - including suggesting that Montgomeryshire needed a new MP - drew much public criticism.

Running career
After a challenge from a colleague, Mair ran her first full marathon in New York city in 1991, in a time of 3:29:00. This result for a beginner encouraged her to keep training and she won the Reykjavik Marathon in 1996.
She entered the trials for the Great Britain athletics squad for the 1997 World Championships in Athens, Greece, where she came 23rd in the Women's Marathon in a time of 2:42:31.

Mair kept running and in 2014 finished 3rd in the Snowdonia Marathon.

In 2016 Mair set a new British record for the marathon, in the W55 Category, by completing the London Marathon in a time of 2.57.46.

Personal life 
Mair has two daughters with her second husband Jonathan Cray, a cameraman for Tinopolis. The family live in Peterston-super-Ely in the Vale of Glamorgan.

Mair has argued for Welsh independence.

Competition Record

References

External links
Angharad Mair profile at Tinopolis
Angharad Mair short profile at TV Ark
Wedi 3 & 7: Presenters: Angharad Mair

1960 births
Living people
People from Carmarthen
Welsh female long-distance runners
Welsh female marathon runners
World Athletics Championships athletes for Great Britain
Welsh journalists
British women journalists
Welsh television presenters
Welsh-language television presenters
BBC newsreaders and journalists
Welsh television executives
Women television executives
Tinopolis
British women television journalists
British women radio presenters